The 2021 Team Speedway Junior World Championship was the 17th FIM Team Under-21 World Championship season. The final took place on 10 September 2021, at the Polonia Bydgoszcz Stadium in Bydgoszcz, Poland.

The hosts Poland won their 14th Team Under-21 World Championship and eighth in succession. A new format was in place for 2021 with 7 teams; Poland, Denmark, Great Britain, Latvia, Sweden, Australia and the Czech Republic competing, with Germany listed as a standby team.

Final 
  Bydgoszcz
 10 September 2021

See also 
 2021 Speedway of Nations
 2021 Individual Speedway Junior World Championship

References 

2021
World Team Junior
Team Speedway Junior World Championship
Team Speedway Junior World Championship